The 1985–86 season was the 84th in the history of the Western Football League.

The league champions for the second time in their history were Exmouth Town. The champions of Division One for the second season running were Portway Bristol.

Final tables

Premier Division
The Premier Division remained at 22 clubs after Devizes Town were relegated to the First Division. One club joined:

Torrington, runners-up in the First Division.

First Division
The First Division remained at 22 clubs, after Torrington were promoted to the Premier Division. One new club joined:

Devizes Town, relegated from the Premier Division.

References

Western Football League seasons
6